Kent T. Lundgren (July 7, 1914 – August 26, 1986) was an American pharmacist and politician.

Born in Saint Paul, Minnesota, Lundgren served in the United States Army during World War II. He received his bachelor's degree in pharmaceutical science from University of Wisconsin–Madison. He was a pharmacist in Menominee, Michigan and was the owner of the Lundgren Drug Company. Lundgren served in the Michigan Constitutional Convention of 1962. He then served in the Michigan State Senate from 1962 to 1964 and was a Republican. Lundgren died at the Veterans Administration Hospital in Iron Mountain, Michigan.

Notes

External links
Political Graveyard-database

1914 births
1986 deaths
Politicians from Saint Paul, Minnesota
People from Menominee, Michigan
Military personnel from Michigan
Military personnel from Minnesota
University of Wisconsin-Madison School of Pharmacy alumni
Pharmacists from Michigan
Businesspeople from Michigan
Republican Party Michigan state senators
20th-century American politicians
20th-century American businesspeople
United States Army personnel of World War II